Granica  is a village in the administrative district of Gmina Kampinos, within Warsaw West County, Masovian Voivodeship, in east-central Poland.

External links
 Jewish Community in Granica on Virtual Shtetl

References

Granica